Eda Warren (October 17, 1903 – July 15, 1980) was an American film editor. She began her Hollywood career as a secretary and started editing films in the late 1920s. Her editing career continued through 1968.

Biography 
Eda was born in Denver, Colorado, in 1903, and was the daughter of Thomas Warren and Henrietta Weber. She and her older sister, Thelma, were raised in Colorado and Nebraska before the family moved west and settled in Beverly Hills. Eda got a job as a film editor, while Thelma worked as a stenographer at a film studio. She later became secretary of the American Cinema Editors group.

Partial filmography
The following were among the films with which Warren was associated:

Evening Clothes (1927)
Dangerous Curves (1929)
Slightly Scarlet (1930)
Ladies Love Brutes (1930)
The Right to Love (1930)
Torch Singer (1933)
Luxury Liner (1933)
So Red the Rose (1935)
The General Died at Dawn (1936)
Forgotten Faces (1936)
Anything Goes (1936)
Mountain Music (1937)
The Big Broadcast of 1938 (1938)
King of Alcatraz (1938)
Honeymoon in Bali  (1939)
 One Night in Lisbon (1941)
 Virginia (1941)
I Married a Witch (1942)
Night Has a Thousand Eyes (1948)
The Big Clock (supervising, with LeRoy Stone-1948)
Where Danger Lives (1950)
Secret of the Incas (1954)
World Without End (1956)
Johnny Concho (1956)
The Unholy Wife (1957)
John Paul Jones (1959)
The Wreck of the Mary Deare (1959)
The Young Savages (1961)
Taras Bulba (1962)
The Private Navy of Sgt. O'Farrell (1968)

See also
Women in film editing

References
Smith, Sharon. Women Who Make Movies. New York: Hopkinson and Blake, 1975. Pgs: 18, 25.

Notes

External links

1903 births
1980 deaths
American film editors
American women film editors